ASEAN School Games (ASG) (also known as the Youth SEA Games) is an annual games for secondary schools student athletes in the Association of Southeast Asian Nations (ASEAN) and organised under the authority of the ASEAN Schools Sports Council (ASSC). The ASSC is an apolitical regional sports council that promotes sports among member countries. Prior to 2009, the games were played based on satellite, single sports events. This was changed in 2009, where a games format was implemented. The 1st ASG planned under the new games format was hosted by Thailand in 2009, while the 2nd, 3rd and 4th ASG were hosted by Malaysia, Singapore and Indonesia, respectively.

The inception of the games format was the outcome of a meeting hosted by Thailand in Chiang Mai in 2008. The planning meeting was jointly led by a ministry official from Singapore (Co-Curricular Activities Branch, Mr Timothy D’Cruz) and Thailand (Department of Physical Education, Dr Patanachart Kridiborworn). Singapore was then at the helm of the ASSC Technical Committee. This milestone planning meeting was responsible for setting the foundation of the guiding principles and direction of the approach that resulted in the birth of the first and subsequent ASGs.

Objectives 
 To promote ASEAN Solidarity in our youth through school sports;
 To provide opportunities for school athletes to benchmark their sporting talents in the ASEAN region; and
 To provide opportunities for school athletes to interact and engage in cultural exchange within ASEAN.

Participating nations

List of ASEAN School Games

Sports
Officially, there were a total of 20 sports, which were held till date in the ASEAN School Games.

All-time medal count

ASEAN School Games editions

2009 ASEAN School Games

2010 ASEAN School Games

2011 ASEAN School Games

2012 ASEAN School Games

2013 ASEAN School Games

2014 ASEAN School Games

2015 ASEAN School Games

2016 ASEAN School Games

2017 ASEAN School Games

2018 ASEAN School Games

2019 ASEAN School Games

2022 ASEAN School Games

External links
 9th ASEAN School Games
 Southeast Asian sports news blogspot
 2010 ASEAN School Games Bulletin at Scribd

References

 
Youth sport in Southeast Asia
Multi-sport events in Asia
ASEAN sports events